is a Japanese pop songwriter and singer. The name Tamurapan is a combination of her surname:  and the French word for rabbit: Lapin.

During the first years of elementary school she lived in Taiwan for some time, while she was still in elementary school she got her amateur radio license.

Discography
In 2002 Tamurapan started her music career doing mainly live shows. In 2007 with the advancement of Myspace in Japan, she started publishing her music on the site. Around the same time she got a limited release of the single:  

She is the first Japanese singer-songwriter to make the move from Myspace to a major label company Columbia Music.

Limited Release Singles

Albums

Independent Album

Mini albums

Albums

Singles

References

External links
  - Myspace website 
  - Official website 
  - website on Columbia Music 

1980 births
Living people
Nippon Columbia artists
Musicians from Gifu Prefecture